James Hutchings "Si" Taylor, OC (born August 26, 1930) is a Canadian former diplomat who served as the Chancellor of McMaster University from 1992 to 1998. Taylor was born and raised in Hamilton and was a Rhodes Scholar, graduating from McMaster in 1951. He worked for the Canadian Department of External Affairs for 40 years and served posts in Vietnam, India, France, the Soviet Union, and Belgium. He also served as the Canadian Ambassador to Japan, Ambassador to NATO; Director–General of European Affairs and Undersecretary of State for External Affairs.

References

1930 births
Living people
McMaster University alumni
People from Hamilton, Ontario
Chancellors of McMaster University
Ambassadors of Canada to Japan
Permanent Representatives of Canada to NATO
Canadian Rhodes Scholars
Canadian diplomats
Officers of the Order of Canada